The Nokia 6110 was a GSM mobile phone from Nokia announced on 18 December 1997 and released in 1998. It is not to be confused with the newer Nokia 6110 Navigator. It was a hugely popular follower of the Nokia 2110, and the first of the many Nokia 6xxx series business-targeted phones. Main improvements over the 2110 were reduced size and improved talk time. It was the first GSM phone to use an ARM processor, as well as the first running on Nokia's Series 20 user interface.

The phone shared the same platform as the Nokia 5110 targeted at the consumer market; unlike the 5110, however, it had the advanced user interface with menu icons (it was the first phone with this new interface that would become the future standard), and featured an infra-red port (once again being Nokia's first phone with it). It was also the first phone from Nokia to have the popular Snake game pre-installed.

It was succeeded/complemented by the similar but enhanced 6150.

Variants

Nokia 6190 is a version of the phone for the North American market, although the infra-red port was removed. Several non-GSM variants were also released aimed at the North American market, including the 800 MHz D-AMPS 6120 (not to be confused with the Nokia 6120 classic), the 800/1900 MHz D-AMPS 6160, and the 800/1900 MHz CDMA 6185.   This was also known as the NK702 on the Orange UK network with a slightly different fascia, however the inside was identical. The GSM 1800 MHz variant was labeled 6130 and had the same exterior design changes, as the dual band GSM 900/1800 MHz 6150 model.

In Brazil, it was licensed for Gradiente to manufacture a variant of Nokia 6120. Such devices, very similar to those manufactured by Nokia, were marketed under the brand Gradiente Concept.

Phone features
 Three games: Memory, Snake (with two-player mode using two phones and IR connection), Logic
 Calculator, clock and calendar
 Currency converter
 Works as a pager
 Profile settings
 4 colours
LINK

Service
 GSM 900 (EUROPE)
 GSM 1900 (US) (6190)
 D-AMPS 800 MHz (US) (6120)
 D-AMPS 800/1900 MHz (US) (6160)
 IS-95/AMPS 800/1900 MHz (US) (6185)

Battery life
 Extended NiMH Battery 900 mAh
 Digital Talk Time up to 3.25 hours
 Digital Standby Time up to 200 hours
 Analog Talk Time up to 2 hours
 Analog Standby Time up to 50 hours

See also
List of Nokia products

References

6110
Mobile phones with infrared transmitter